Khorram Rud Rural District is a rural district (dehestan) in the Central District of Lenjan County, Isfahan Province, Iran. At the 2006 census, its population was 4,940, in 1,245 families.  The rural district has 5 villages.

References 

Rural Districts of Isfahan Province
Lenjan County